Per Yngve "Pelle" Ohlin (16 January 1969 – 8 April 1991), better known by his stage name Dead, was a Swedish metal musician who was best known as the lead vocalist and lyricist of the Norwegian black metal band Mayhem from 1988 until his death in 1991. Prior to Mayhem, he also performed as vocalist in the Swedish death/thrash band Morbid. Dead was a popular figure of the Norwegian black metal scene, and his legacy persists in the genre to this day. Roadrunner Records ranked him No. 48 out of 50 of The Greatest Metal Front-Men of All Time.

Dead was known for his morbid personality and obsession with death. He hoarded dead birds, wore shirts with funeral announcements printed on them, and wore corpse paint—being one of the first in black metal to do so. Acquaintances and peers described Ohlin as difficult to befriend or understand. Already intensely introverted and depressed, Dead's personality and demeanor would only become more withdrawn leading up to his death, a progression marked by such patterns as harming himself offstage among friends and isolating himself for long periods in his bedroom.

Dead committed suicide in April 1991 at the age of 22. An image of his dead body was used as the cover of the bootleg live album The Dawn of the Black Hearts. His death marked a turning point in the history of the Norwegian black metal scene, leading to a wave of erratic behavior by the scene's members.

Early life
Per Ohlin (sometimes called "Pelle") was born on 16 January 1969 in Västerhaninge, Sweden to parents Anita Forsberg and Lars Ohlin, who divorced soon after his birth. As a young child, he suffered from sleep apnea. At the age of ten, he suffered internal bleeding when his spleen ruptured after what he claimed was an ice skating accident. However, in the Swedish metal book Blod eld död (English: "Blood Fire Death"), his brother Anders Ohlin stated in an exclusive interview that Dead was frequently bullied in school and one day sustained a ruptured spleen as a direct result of a severe beating by bullies. Because of the injury, he had to be rushed to a hospital, where he was, for a time, declared clinically dead. After a few years, the incident resulted in a fascination with death, and later inspired his stage name.

As a teenager, he developed a taste for heavy metal and rock music, citing bands like Black Sabbath, Kiss, Iron Maiden, Judas Priest, AC/DC, Motörhead, Venom, Metallica,  Bathory, Sodom, and Mercyful Fate as his favorites. Despite his love for Bathory, he was very displeased after their change in musical style, and consequently referred to Quorthon as "a wimp".

Career

Morbid and Mayhem
In early 1986, he founded the Swedish thrash/death metal group Morbid, with which he recorded a demo tape called December Moon. Disappointed that the band wasn't "going anywhere", he decided to contact members of Mayhem as he was aware the group were in need of a new frontman following vocalist Maniac's departure. According to Mayhem bassist Jørn "Necrobutcher" Stubberud, Dead initially sent the band members a small parcel containing a demo tape, a letter detailing his ideas for the future, and a crucified mouse. Although Necrobutcher lost the package itself, he kept the tape which had Dead's contact details. At that point, Dead moved to Norway in early 1988 and became the new official vocalist for Mayhem.

Performances
For concerts, Dead went to great lengths to achieve the image and atmosphere he wished. From the beginning of his career, he wore "corpse paint", which involved covering his face with black and white makeup. According to Necrobutcher, "[i]t wasn't anything to do with the way Kiss and Alice Cooper used makeup. Dead actually wanted to look like a corpse. He didn't do it to look cool". Hellhammer claimed that Dead "was the first black metal musician to use corpse paint", although this statement has been proven to be debatable as Euronymous can be seen wearing corpse paint in live footage as early as 1985. To complete his corpse-like image, Dead would bury his stage clothes and dig them up again to wear on the night of a concert. According to Hellhammer:
Before the shows, Dead used to bury his clothes into the ground so that they could start to rot and get that grave scent. He was a corpse on a stage. Once he even asked us to bury him in the ground — he wanted his skin to become pale.

During one tour with Mayhem, he found a dead crow and kept it in a plastic bag. He often carried it about with him and would smell the bird before going onstage, to sing "with the stench of death in his nostrils." He would also collect dead geese, and keep them underneath his bed.

Dead would cut himself while singing onstage. During a gig in Jessheim on February 3, 1990, he slashed his arm with a broken bottle. Faust claims that Dead had to be taken to hospital after the gig, but arrived too late and so "it was no use to give him stitches".

In an interview conducted by Marduk guitarist Morgan Håkansson, and published in the fanzine Slayer, Dead explained how he and the rest of Mayhem would expel poseurs at their concerts. Reciting the events of one particular show, he claimed "Before we began to play there was a crowd of about 300 in there, but in the second song 'Necrolust' we began to throw around those pig heads. Only 50 were left." He and the other members enjoyed this sort of practice; he concluded with  "If someone doesn't like blood and rotten flesh thrown in their face they can FUCK OFF, and that's exactly what they do."

Dead also made a brief appearance in the 1986 music video for Candlemass' "Bewitched".

Personality
In interviews, fellow musicians often described Dead as odd and introverted. Mayhem drummer Jan Axel "Hellhammer" Blomberg described Dead as "a very strange personality […] depressed, melancholic, and dark". Likewise, Mayhem guitarist Øystein "Euronymous" Aarseth once said, "I honestly think Dead is mentally insane. Which other way can you describe a guy who does not eat, in order to get starving wounds? Or who has a T-shirt with funeral announcements on it?" Former Mayhem drummer Kjetil Manheim later likened Dead's personality to that of Marvin the Paranoid Android. Some authors have speculated that Dead may have had Cotard delusion, a very rare condition that manifests in believing one's body is not that of a living human but instead a corpse; this theory is supported by a variety of statements from Dead on the subject of his blood and body.

According to Emperor drummer Bård "Faust" Eithun:
 [Dead] wasn't a guy you could know very well. I think even the other guys in Mayhem didn't know him very well. He was hard to get close to. I met him two weeks before he died. I'd met him maybe six to eight times, in all. He had lots of weird ideas. I remember Aarseth was talking about him and said he did not have any humor. He did, but it was very obscure. Honestly, I don't think he was enjoying living in this world, which of course resulted in the suicide.
Stian "Occultus" Johannsen, who briefly took over as vocalist after Dead's suicide, remarked that Dead did not even possess a normal perception of himself:
He [Dead] didn't see himself as human; he saw himself as a creature from another world. He said he had many visions that his blood has frozen in his veins, that he was dead. That is the reason he took that name. He knew he would die.

According to a longtime pen pal of Ohlin known as "Old Nick", Ohlin disliked technology. He would only ever write letters to himself or others using longhand style, and would never resort to the use of a PC. Old Nick concluded "technology in general made him [feel] uncomfortable. He just rejected it altogether, finding refuge [instead] in a world made of forests and woodlands." He also had an unusual interest with porphyria due to its connection to the mythology of vampirism.

Self-harm and suicide

In time, Dead's social situation and his fascination with death caused his mental state to worsen greatly. He would casually cut himself while in the presence of his friends, who would have to subdue him and patch him up. Although this upset many of his friends, Euronymous grew fascinated with Dead's suicidal ideologies because he felt extreme negativity fit Mayhem's image—and according to them, he encouraged Dead to kill himself. Manheim said: "I don't know if Øystein did it out of pure evil or if he was just fooling around."

By 1991, Dead, Euronymous and Hellhammer were living in a house in the woods near Kråkstad, which was used as a place for the band to rehearse. According to Hellhammer, Dead spent much of his time writing letters and drawing. He "just sat in his room and became more and more depressed". Mayhem bassist Necrobutcher said that, after living together for a while, Dead and Euronymous "got on each other's nerves a lot". Hellhammer recalls an anecdote where Dead once retreated outside to sleep in the woods because Euronymous was playing synth music that Dead hated. Euronymous followed and began shooting into the air with a shotgun to further antagonize him. Varg Vikernes of Burzum claims that Dead once stabbed Euronymous with a knife during an altercation. Vikernes also claims to have sent Mayhem ammunition, including shotgun shells, as a Christmas gift, although he claimed those were not the shells Dead used to kill himself, and that he instead saved a "special shell" particularly to be used for his suicide.

On 8 April 1991, while left alone in the house, Dead used a hunting knife to slit his wrists and throat, and afterward, shot himself in the forehead with a shotgun. He left a brief suicide note which started with the line "Excuse the blood...". His body was found by Euronymous, who had to climb through an open window as the doors were locked and there were no other keys to the house. Instead of calling the police immediately, he visited a nearby shop to purchase a disposable camera with which he photographed the body; after re-arranging some items for his pictures, he proceeded to call emergency services. Dead's suicide caused a rift between Euronymous and some of his friends, who were disgusted by his attitude towards Dead before the suicide, and his behavior about Dead's death afterwards. Necrobutcher ended his friendship with Euronymous and left Mayhem. Manheim later speculated that Euronymous had willfully left Dead alone in the house so that he would have a chance to kill himself. Dead's suicide was said to cause "a change in mentality" in the black metal scene and was the first in a string of infamous events carried out by its members.

An obituary in a Swedish newspaper stated that Dead's funeral was held at Österhaninge kyrka (Eastern Haninge Church) on Friday 26 April 1991. He was buried at Österhaninge begravningsplats (Eastern Haninge graveyard), located in Stockholm.

Legacy
Euronymous used Dead's suicide to foster Mayhem's "evil" image and claimed Dead had killed himself because black metal had become "trendy" and commercialized. Necrobutcher speculated that taking the pictures and forcing others to see them was a way for Euronymous to cope with the shock of seeing his friend's body. After Hellhammer developed the photos, Euronymous initially promised to destroy them, but ultimately did not. He stored them in an envelope at his record shop Helvete and sent one to the owner of Warmaster Records which resulted in its use as cover art for the bootleg live album The Dawn of the Black Hearts, which was released in 1995. The cover of Mayhem's Live in Leipzig contains part of Dead's suicide note: Jag är inte en människa. Det här är bara en dröm, och snart vaknar jag. (Roughly translated: I am not a human being. This is just a dream, and soon I will wake.)

In time, rumors spread that Euronymous had made a stew with bits of Dead's brain and had made necklaces with bits of his skull. The band later denied the former rumor, but confirmed that the latter was true. Moreover, Euronymous claimed to have given these necklaces to musicians he deemed worthy, which was confirmed by several other members of the scene, like Bård "Faust" Eithun, Metalion, and Morgan Håkansson.

Necrobutcher noted that "people became more aware of the black metal scene after Dead had shot himself ... I think it was Dead's suicide that really changed the scene".

Discography
Ohlin contributed vocals to all of the following:

As a part of Morbid
Morbid Rehearsal (1987) (Demo album)
December Moon (1987) (Demo album)
Live in Stockholm (2000) (Live album)
Year of the Goat (2011) (Compilation album)

As a part of Mayhem
Live in Leipzig (1993) (Live album)
The Dawn of the Black Hearts (1995) (bootleg live album)
Freezing Moon/Carnage (1996) (Single)
Out from the Dark (1996) (Demo album)
Live in Zeitz (2016) (Live album)
Live in Jessheim (2017) (Live album)
De Mysteriis Dom Sathanas: The Dead Files (2017) (Compilation album)
Deathcrush: The Dead Version (2018) (Compilation album)
Live in Sarpsborg (2019) (Live album)

Split albums
A Tribute to the Black Emperors (1994) (Morbid & Mayhem compilation album)

References

Works cited

External links
 
 
 

1969 births
Black metal singers
Mayhem (band) members
Singers from Stockholm
Suicides by firearm in Norway
Swedish heavy metal musicians
20th-century Swedish male singers
Burials at Skogskyrkogården
1991 suicides